Chen Chiu-tan (born 16 September 1974) is a Taiwanese table tennis player. She competed in the women's singles event at the 1996 Summer Olympics.

References

1974 births
Living people
Taiwanese female table tennis players
Olympic table tennis players of Taiwan
Table tennis players at the 1996 Summer Olympics
Place of birth missing (living people)
Asian Games medalists in table tennis
Asian Games bronze medalists for Chinese Taipei
Table tennis players at the 1998 Asian Games
Table tennis players at the 2002 Asian Games
Medalists at the 1998 Asian Games
20th-century Taiwanese women